The Hazleton Mountaineers were one of the original six franchises in the Eastern Professional Basketball League.  The Mountaineers were the league's first team to have an integrated roster, as two former members of the New York Rens, Bill Brown and Zack Clayton, joined John Isaacs on the Mountaineers' roster. The franchise folded after the 1947-48 season, and a second Mountaineers team moved from Ashland, Pennsylvania during the 1951-52 season, but folded after losing eight straight games.

Year-by-Year

Hazleton Mountaineers, EPBL

Hazleton Mountaineers (from Ashland Greens)

Notable alumni
Morrie Arnovich, major league All Star outfielder

Continental Basketball Association teams